Saithan is a 2016 Indian Tamil-language action thriller film written and directed by Pradeep Krishnamoorthy. The film stars Vijay Antony in a dual role with Arundhati Nair, Charuhasan, Y. G. Mahendra, Siddhartha Shankar and Kitty amongst others forming the secondary cast. Based on the novel Aaah! by Sujatha, it revolves around a software engineer who gets into trouble after he starts hearing strange voices asking him to kill a woman named Jayalakshmi. The film was released theatrically on 1 December 2016.

Plot 
The film opens with Dinesh (Vijay Antony) and his boss (Y. G. Mahendra) visiting a psychiatrist. Here, Dinesh tells the doctor that he had been listening to a voice for a few days, and it has been troubling him. Upon questioning the source of the voice, Dinesh tells that the voice sounds like that of God, if he were present really. The doctor asks Dinesh to come along with him for a personal treatment where Dinesh tells him that he had killed his friend Ravi. The doctor asks Dinesh to relax and hypnotises him in his sleep, where he asks him various questions. It is revealed that a clever Dinesh had been recently married to a beautiful orphan Aishwarya (Arundhati Nair), who had contacted him through a matrimonial site. After their return from their Honeymoon trip, Dinesh starts hallucinating and listening to voices in his head. Also, his best friend Ravi, who comes to help him, gets killed in a car accident due to Dinesh. Dinesh catches the bus and goes to a slum area in a prostitute's place who is also named Jayalakshmi. Dinesh tries to kill the prostitute as voices had told him to do so. But, she runs away, and people catch him. The Psychiatrist hypnotises Dinesh and sends him back to when he was ten years old. The voice in Dinesh's head keeps telling him to die, and Dinesh sees miserable things on TV screens, computer screens and distorted bruised faces near the windows. After the treatment, the doctor tells Dinesh not to wander off alone and tells his boss that Dinesh has got disturbed memories of his past life.

On returning home, a disturbed Dinesh aimlessly runs away from home and reaches Tanjavore in a train. While in the train, he hears the same voice in his head directing him to that village, and he names Sharma, Gopal, Natraj and Jayalakshmi. As soon as he gets down, he hires an auto to find what happened to him and who is the voice. Upon investigating, he finds out a picture of Sharma (Vijay Antony in his previous life) was a respected bachelor who adopted a boy Gopal and later married Jayalakshmi (Arundhati Nair). Things go smooth until Nataraj (Arav) enters the school. Jaylakshmi and Nataraj get close and have a baby who takes the name of Sharma as his father. Though the talks go through the village, Sharma still loves and cares for the baby. One day when Nataraj passes through Sharma's house, an angry Sharma tries to rush out and confront Nataraj. In this chaos, the baby falls down and dies. Jayalakshmi runs away after this incident. Two weeks later, both Sharma and Gopal are found dead on the banks of a river and Jayalakshmi, Nataraj, are absconding. The case gets closed as they are not tracked down.

Unknown to everyone is that, Jayalakshmi returns and meets Sharma asking for forgiveness, which he readily does. Jayalakshmi feeds him food which is poisoned, and later Nataraj and Jayalakshmi kill him and Gopal for killing their baby. Then, they abandon their bodies near a river bank and run away.

A disturbed Dinesh wakes up to find himself in the mental asylum where he is being treated. Aishwarya comes to him with a tiffin box to feed him. Dinesh, who has Sharma's soul inside him, charges upon Aishwarya, who looks like Jayalakshmi, because he and Gopal were killed the same way. He is sedated and left inside his room for a few days, where Sharma refuses to accept leave Dinesh's body. In the meanwhile, Aishwarya goes missing leaving behind a letter after she gets a call from Thomas.

It is revealed that Aishwarya had married Dinesh, just to test a drug on him. But guilt drives her to become a good husband-loving woman, and she refuses to do any harm to him. and that the drug had caused him to remember his past. Thomas calls up Dinesh and asks him to bring back the shreds of evidence that were stolen from his guest house. When Dinesh comes with it, the gang Aishwarya had worked for reveals to Dinesh that she was a prostitute to the whole gang before she became his wife. Dinesh accepts the fact and asks to take Aishwarya away with him. A scuffle ensues, and Dinesh is drugged with high doses of the chemical. This causes him to get extra ordinary power while his body is taken over by Sharma, and he takes down everyone and heads to finish Aishwarya. Now Sharma confronts Aishwarya thinking her to be Jayalakshmi, and is at the verge of killing her. Aishwarya, who is pregnant with Dinesh's child, tells him that she doesn't know about what he is speaking and that she is sorry for Dinesh's condition. She also puts forward a wish to be his wife and the mother of his child. She also saves him from getting killed by Dr. Christopher (Kamal Krishna), who runs the drug scam and also illegal organ mafia business. In the process of saving Dinesh, she gets injured badly. Sharma, who is in Dinesh's body, acts in defense and kills Dr. Christopher.

Later, in the media, the wrongdoing of the gang and their drugs. Also, they reveal that Dinesh was a victim as he was used as a test subject, and Aishwarya, who was wounded, is alright now.

Aishwarya, Dinesh and Dinesh's mother are in the hospital where Aishwarya is being treated. They get a call from the apartment neighbor that a woman Jayalakshmi had come to visit Dinesh. Dinesh goes to his house, where he is informed that, that lady had died and that she had asked him for an apology. When Dinesh sees her, he notices that she has a photo held in her hand (The 50 year old photo of herself and Sharma in it). The Jayalakshmi he appeared to have seen wasn't the real Jayalakshmi. It wasn't his wife, but another lady (Ramya Nambeesan). Jayalakshmi had died without Sharma avenging her death. Also, Sharma had left Dinesh's body for good as he is going to be a father soon.

Cast 

Vijay Antony as Dinesh / Sharma (School Head Master)
Arundhati Nair as Aishwarya / Jayalakshmi
Y. G. Mahendra as Dinesh's boss
Meera Krishnan as Dinesh's mother
Kitty as Psychiatrist
Charuhasan as "Yettu" Arumugam
Aadukalam Murugadoss as Ravi
Aarav as Nataraj
Siddhartha Shankar as Thomas
Kamal Krishna as Dr. Christopher
Vijay Sarathy as Auto Driver
Vinitha as Ravi's wife
Ramya Nambeesan as Jayalakshmi (cameo)

Production 
In June 2014, Vijay Antony announced that he was working on a project titled Saithan, which would begin after the completion of his impending films. Bike racer Alisha Abdullah also revealed that she would be a part of the film during an interview in October 2014, stating that it was a psychological thriller and based on the novel, The Girl with the Dragon Tattoo. She later did not feature in the film, while the director chose to adapt Writer Sujatha's novella Aah into the plot of the film. The film began production during March 2016 and was completed in November 2016. Arav, who later became popular with the show Bigg Boss, made his acting debut with this film, and had no lines of dialogue.

Music 
Soundtrack was composed by Vijay Antony. The album was released on November 3, 2016. The song "Yedhedho" which appeared in Sattapadi Kutram (2011) was again retained in the film.

Marketing 
Vijay Antony came up with a unique promotional strategy by releasing the first 5 minutes of the film as sneak peek.

Reception

References

External links 
 

2010s Tamil-language films
2016 action thriller films
2016 directorial debut films
2016 films
2016 psychological thriller films
Films about drugs
Films based on Indian novels
Films directed by Pradeep Krishnamoorthy
Films scored by Vijay Antony
Films shot in Chennai
Films shot in Kerala
Indian action thriller films
Tamil-language psychological thriller films